Sergey Yuryevich Zlobin (born 29 May 1970) is a Russian racing driver, who  competed twice in the Le Mans 24h Endurance Race alongside being a test driver for Minardi.

Career

Zlobin began racing in 1996 at the later age of 26, and took part in several competitions, such as Danian Cup in rallycross. In 1998, he made a switch to single-seater racing, initially competing in Russian Formula Three Championship and Euro Formula 3000 for several years. 

In August 2002, he was announced as a test driver for the Minardi Formula One team, becoming the first Russian to test a Formula 1 car. His signing was a part of the sponsorship deal that Minardi made with Gazprom, brokered by Oksana Kosachenko. However, Gazprom paid only 2 million dollars out the promised 9 million during the season, which led to the contract breaking down. After a one-year hiatus, Zlobin returned to motorsport in 2004, and continued the testing programme with Minardi.

Zlobin competed at Le Mans twice, in 2005 and 2014.  He competed in a number of GT and Endurance racing series, including the FIA GT Championship, Blancpain Endurance Series and European Le Mans Series.

Personal life
On 24 September 2007, Zlobin survived a car bomb which had been planted in his Mercedes-Benz G500.  The explosion caused minor injuries to Zlobin's legs, but he was able to get out of the vehicle himself to call police.

Career summary

24 Hours of Le Mans results

References

Living people
Russian racing drivers
Italian Formula Renault 2.0 drivers
Auto GP drivers
FIA GT Championship drivers
24 Hours of Le Mans drivers
European Le Mans Series drivers
Blancpain Endurance Series drivers
1970 births
24 Hours of Daytona drivers
WeatherTech SportsCar Championship drivers
FIA World Endurance Championship drivers
24 Hours of Spa drivers
Sportspeople from Moscow
SMP Racing drivers
AF Corse drivers